Ministry of Health is a ministry of the Government of Botswana. Its stated aim is to promote and manage health and ensure environmental concerns are considered in all aspects of national development.

Leadership 

 Edwin Dikoloti - Minister
 Sethomo Lelatisitswe - Assistant Minister
 Kabelo Ebineng - Permanent Secretary

Citation:

See also 

 Health in Botswana
 COVID-19 pandemic in Botswana
 List of hospitals in Botswana

References

External links 

 

Health in Botswana
Government ministries of Botswana
Health ministries